La Chapelle-au-Riboul is a commune in the Mayenne department and Pays de la Loire region of France.

See also
Communes of the Mayenne department

References

Chapelleauriboul